= Spanish Flat, El Dorado County, California =

Unincorporated community in California, United States

Spanish Flat
- Unincorporated community
- Location in California Spanish Flat (the United States)
- Coordinates: 38°49′24″N 120°48′34″W
- Country: United States
- State: California
- County: El Dorado County
- Elevation: 2,431 ft (741 m)

Spanish Flat is an unincorporated community in El Dorado County, California. It is located 4 miles (6 km) north of Chili Bar, at an elevation of 2431 feet (741 m).

A post office operated at Spanish Flat from 1853 to 1872 and for a while in 1888. The name commemorates Spanish-speaking miners at the site.
